Magic Lamp is a 2008 Indian Malayalam-language film, directed by K. K. Haridas and produced by Cherupuzha Jose. Jayaram, Meena, Sangeetha, Divya Unni, Kalabhavan Mani, Oduvil Unnikrishnan, Kottayam Nazeer appear in lead roles. The film had musical score by Ouseppachan.

Plot
Anupama gets a photo of a person while travelling in Bengaluru. She wanted to become an air hostess but her family has a tradition that the women in their family will not work and she should marry one of her 'mora cherukkan' (fiancé). To escape from marriage, she lies to her family that she is in love which turns out to be a coach in a college named Sunny Kuruvila.

Anupama's uncle Vikram Dada goes to hit him but Sunny hits Vikram back due to loss of his lover of six years, Alphonsa. Anupama changes her lover's name to Dr. Nandakumar, a stuttering doctor, whose wife Viji leaves him due to the same misunderstanding.

Anupama reveals her fake love to Lalan, a no case lawyer and he tells to the family that Anupama was raped in Goa by a Malayali. This eventually leads to Chandrasenan. Senan sees the remaining two doppelgangers and makes a scheme to know the truth.

Senan goes to Anupama's house first to marry her, then he entered the house as a tree buyer. When Anupama gets her air hostess job, Senan understands that she did all this to go for that job. She also tells Lalan that she used him to get the job. This angers Lalan, so he and Senan scheme to prevent her from going to the job. Lalan's scheme works and Anupama gets kidnapped by Mumbai thugs and frames Senan for the kidnapping. Senan tells Sunny to go as Senan as he is the only person to save her. The police arrest Sunny thinking as Senan by Sunny's future brother-in-law. Things turn out good between Alphonsa and Sunny and Senan rescues Anupama. When Anupama proposes to Senan, he turns her down and to get Senan she feigns pregnancy. Senan goes to Dr. Nandakumar's house as the doctor and gets Viji and his son. On Sunny's engagement day a final fight happens between Manikandan, the Mumbai thugs, the doctor's father-in-law's thugs, etc. In the process they reveal that they are not one, but three identical (Senan, Sunny, Dr. Nandakumar). Everyone gets their brides and goes to Bengaluru and sees that the real owner of the photo was living all the time in Bengaluru.

Cast
 
Jayaram as Chandrasenan / Sunny Kuruvilla / Dr. Nandakumar / Muslim Man
Meena as Anupama 
Sangeetha as Alphonsa
Divya Unni as Viji
Khushbu as Muslim Man's wife
Kalabhavan Mani as Chalakkudy Manikandan
Oduvil Unnikrishnan as Achutha Menon
Baiju as Dr. Mohanakrishnan, a Veterinarian 
Kottayam Nazeer as Dr. Omanakuttan, an Ayurvedic doctor
Jagathy Sreekumar as Adv. Lalan
Janardhanan as Ananthan Menon
C. I. Paul as Balan Menon
K. P. A. C. Lalitha as Bharathiyamma
Indrans as Sankaranunni
Augustine as Vikram Dada Bhai
Kalabhavan Shajohn 
Mamukkoya as Mavu Koya
Manga Mahesh
Priyanka as Maid
Ramu as Alphonsa's elder brother
Kozhikode Narayanan Nair as Viji's father
Motta Rajendran as Goon
Dimple Rose

References

External links
 

2008 films
2000s Malayalam-language films
Films directed by K. K. Haridas